A magnetic lens is a device for the focusing or deflection of moving charged particles, such as electrons or ions, by use of the magnetic Lorentz force. Its strength can often be varied by usage of electromagnets.

Magnetic lenses are used in diverse applications, from cathode ray tubes over electron microscopy to particle accelerators.

Design 

A magnetic lens typically consists of several electromagnets arranged in a quadrupole (see quadrupole magnet), sextupole, or higher format; the electromagnetic coils are placed at the vertices of a square or another regular polygon. From this configuration a customized magnetic field can be formed to manipulate the particle beam.

Note that the magnetic field is inhomogeneous, particles close to the center are less strongly deflected than those passing the lens far from the axis.

Uses 

Television sets employing cathode ray tubes use a magnetic lens in the form of a deflection yoke to enable an electron beam to scan the image by deflecting it vertically and horizontally.

See also 

 Charged particle beam
 Electron optics
 Electron beam technology
 Ion beam
 Mass spectrometry
 Quadrupole ion trap
 Quadrupole mass analyzer

Notes

References

External links

Accelerator physics
Cathode ray tube
Electromagnetic coils
Television technology
Types of magnets